Henry Newton (5 January 1866 – 25 September 1947) was an Anglican colonial bishop who served two Southern Hemisphere dioceses in the first half of the 20th century.

Early life
Newton was born Henry Wilkinson, the son of Thomas Wilkinson and his wife Anne (née Magney), in Buckland, near Beechworth, Victoria. In 1876 he was adopted by the Rev Frederick Robert Newton, and subsequently took his surname.

Clerical career
He was educated at St. Paul's College, Sydney and Merton College, Oxford. Ordained in 1891, after a curacy at St John's, Hackney he returned to the Antipodes where he became priest at St Agnes's Church, Esk, Queensland, and then a missionary in New Guinea. From 1915 to 1922 he was the second Bishop of Carpentaria. During his term as bishop, St Paul's Theological College, Moa, was opened for native students to train for ordination, and in 1919 he ordained the first two Torres Strait Islanders to become deacons, Poey Passi and Joseph Lui. Translated to New Guinea in 1922, he retired in 1936.

Honours 
In 1935, he was awarded the King George V Silver Jubilee Medal. He was one of six recipients from the region. After his death, Newton Theological College was renamed in his honour.

References

1866 births
Alumni of Merton College, Oxford
Anglican bishops of Carpentaria
Anglican bishops of New Guinea
20th-century Anglican bishops in Oceania
1947 deaths